Group F of the 1986 FIFA World Cup was one of the groups of the 1986 FIFA World Cup. The group's first round of matches began on 2 June and its last matches were played on 11 June. Most matches were played at the Estadio Universitario and the Estadio Tecnológico in Monterrey. After the first four matches yielded just two goals, locals dubbed it the "Group of Sleep". Morocco surprisingly topped the group, joined in the second round by England and Poland. Portugal were the other team in this group, making their first appearance since 1966.

Morocco drew their first two matches 0–0 against Poland and England, while Portugal defeated England in their opening match 1–0, but were themselves beaten by Poland by the same scoreline. England's match against Morocco featured their first sending-off in a World Cup, when Ray Wilkins was shown a red card after throwing the ball which struck the referee when an offside decision went against England. Thus, Poland led the group after two games, with Portugal in second place on goals scored. However, England defeated Poland 3–0 with a first half hat-trick from Gary Lineker to take second place behind Morocco, who beat Portugal 3–1 with goals from Abderrazak Khairi and Abdelkrim Merry. Poland, in third, only qualified for the second round as one of the four best third-place finishers.

Standings

Matches

Morocco vs Poland

Portugal vs England

England vs Morocco

Poland vs Portugal

England vs Poland

Portugal vs Morocco

References

Group F
group
Poland at the 1986 FIFA World Cup
Group
Portugal at the 1986 FIFA World Cup